The For the People Act, introduced as H.R.1, is a bill in the United States Congress intended to expand voting rights, change campaign finance laws to reduce the influence of money in politics, ban partisan gerrymandering, and create new ethics rules for federal officeholders.
 
The act was originally introduced by John Sarbanes in 2019, on behalf of the newly elected Democratic majority in the United States House of Representatives as the first official legislation of the 116th United States Congress. The House passed the bill on March 8, by a party-line vote of 234–193. The bill was viewed as a "signature piece of legislation" from the Democratic House majority. After the House passed the bill, it was blocked from receiving a vote by the then Republican-controlled Senate, under Senate Majority Leader Mitch McConnell.

In 2021, in the 117th Congress, congressional Democrats reintroduced the act as H.R.1 and S.1. On March 3, 2021, the bill passed the House of Representatives on a near party-line vote of 220–210, advancing to the Senate, which is split 50–50 between Democrats and Republicans (with Democratic Vice President Kamala Harris holding the tie-breaking vote), and Senate Majority Leader Chuck Schumer vowed to bring it to the floor for a vote. On June 22, 2021, a vote on the bill was held in the Senate. It received unified support from the Democratic caucus, but Senate Republicans blocked the bill with a filibuster, as it lacked the 60 votes needed to invoke cloture after a party-line vote. Some Senate Democrats expressed support for abolishing the filibuster for the bill, but others in their caucus remained opposed or expressed reservations about doing so, including Senators Joe Manchin and Kyrsten Sinema.

Key provisions

Voting rights
The bill would require states to offer same-day voter registration for federal elections and to permit voters to make changes to their registration at the polls. It would require states to hold early voting for at least two weeks and would establish automatic voter registration for individuals to be eligible to vote in elections for federal office in the state. Under the automatic voter registration provision, eligible citizens who provide information to state agencies (including state departments of motor vehicles or public universities) would be automatically registered to vote unless they opt out of doing so. The bill would also expand opportunities to vote by mail and would make Election Day a federal holiday. The bill would require states to offer online voter registration, which has already been adopted in 39 states and the District of Columbia; under the bill, states would be required to establish a system to allow applications to be electronically completed, submitted, and received by election officials, and to allow registered voters to electronically update their voter registration information. The bill would establish criminal penalties for persons who "corruptly hinder, interfere with, or prevent another person from registering to vote" and for voter deception or intimidation (the bill would specifically "prohibit knowing and intentional communication of false and misleading informationincluding about the time, place, or manner of elections, public endorsements, and the rules governing voter eligibility and voter registrationmade with the intent of preventing eligible voters from casting ballots"). The bill would instruct the Election Assistance Commission to adopt recommendations for states on the prevention of interference with voter registration.

The bill would also authorize 16- and 17-year-olds to pre-register to vote in advance of their becoming 18. A 2019 proposal by Representative Ayanna Pressley to amend the bill to actually allow 16- and 17-year-olds to vote did not succeed. The bill would also prohibit the practice of voter caging and restrict the practicing of voter-roll purges by limiting states' ability to remove registered voters from the rolls and setting conditions for when they could do so. Specifically, the bill would require states to obtain certain information before removing voters from the rolls, and would prohibit voter purges from taking place less than six months before an election. The bill prohibits any person from communicating "materially false" claims meant to prevent others from voting 60 days before an election and compels the attorney general to correct such misinformation. The bill also requires elections officials to timely notify any voter tagged for removal from the rolls and give them an opportunity to contest the removal or seek reinstatement of their registration. It also restores voting rights to felons who complete prison terms.

The bill contains various provisions to promote voting access for people with disabilities and provisions to strengthen the Uniformed and Overseas Citizens Absentee Voting Act (UOCAVA) by providing additional protections for military and overseas voters. To ensure UOCAVA compliance, the bill would "require all states... to send uniformed service and overseas voters' ballots at least 45 days before a federal election (provided a request was received at least 45 days before the election); require states to use and pay for express delivery and return of ballots if they fail to send ballots to uniformed and overseas voters by that deadline; [and] extend the guarantee of state residency for voting purposes to all spouses and dependents of absent servicemembers (current law extends the guarantee of residency only to servicemembers themselves)." The bill would create a cause of action allowing the attorney general or a private party to sue if a state violates these provisions, and would require states to send reports to Congress documenting "the availability of absentee balloting for servicemembers and overseas voters, how many ballots were transmitted, and how many were returned."

The bill would also create a Congressional task force on voting rights in American territories.

Election security
The bill contains election security provisions, including a voter verified paper ballot provision mandating the use of paper ballots that can be marked by voters either by hand or with a ballot marking device and inspected by the voter to allow any errors to be corrected before the ballot is cast. The bill would also require state officials to preserve paper ballots for recounts or audits, and to conduct a hand count of ballots for recounts and audits. The bill would require the voting machines used in all federal elections to be manufactured in the U.S.

The bill would also direct the National Science Foundation "to make grants to study, test, and develop accessible paper ballot voting, verification, and casting mechanisms."

Campaign finance reform
The bill would introduce voluntary public financing for campaigns, matching small donations at a 6:1 ratio. The money would come from a new "Freedom From Influence Fund" under the U.S. Treasury, which would collect funds by charging a small fee assessed on criminal and civil fines and penalties or settlements with banks and corporations that commit corporate malfeasance. It also incorporates campaign finance reform provisions from the DISCLOSE Act, which would impose stricter limitations on foreign lobbying, require super PACs and other "dark money" organizations to disclose their donors, and restructure the Federal Election Commission to reduce partisan gridlock. The bill expresses support for a constitutional amendment to overturn Citizens United v. FEC

The bill also raises the limit the national committee of a political party can spend on a political candidate to $100,000,000.

Ethics
The bill would require the president and vice president, as well as presidential and vice-presidential candidates, to publicly disclose their previous ten years of income tax returns. The bill would also eliminate the use of taxpayer money by members of Congress to settle employment discrimination claims, by requiring members of Congress to reimburse the Treasury for any such payments. Another part of the bill would require the Judicial Conference to establish rules of ethics binding on the Supreme Court of the United States, the only court in the U.S. without a binding canon of judicial ethics.

The legislation would also set new disclosure rules and limitations on presidential inaugural committees. Inaugural committees would be barred from taking money from corporations; a contribution limit to inaugural committees of $50,000 per person would be imposed (under current law, there is no limit); contributions of more than $1,000 would have to be disclosed within one day; and the use of funds donated to inaugural committees would be restricted only to use for inaugural events and for charitable contributions.

Findings in support of D.C. statehood
H.R. 1 makes findings in support of admitting the District of Columbia as a state. Specifically, it affirms Congress's power under the Constitution's ArticleIV to create a new state in the populated area that is now D.C., while retaining a separate federal district comprising the Capitol Complex, White House, National Mall, and certain other federal areas. H.R.1 does not itself admit D.C. as a state. Separate legislation, H.R.51, would actually admit D.C. to the Union. The House of Representatives passed that legislation in June 2020 on a nearly party-line vote; the measure was not taken up in the Republican-controlled Senate. The House passage of H.R.51 marked the first time that either chamber of Congress had passed a D.C. statehood bill, and the Democratic leadership in the House vowed to bring a D.C. statehood bill to the floor again in the 117th Congress, which they did on April 22, 2021, and which passed again by a vote of 216-208.

Gerrymandering
The bill would attempt to thwart gerrymandering by requiring states to use independent commissions to draw congressional district lines, except in states with only one congressional district. Partisan gerrymandering (creating a map that "unduly favor[s] or disfavor[s]" one political party over another) would be prohibited (Illinois is cited as an example). The legislation would require each commission to have 15 members (five Democrats, five Republicans, and five independents) and would require proposed maps to achieve a majority vote to be accepted, with at least one vote in support from a Democrat, a Republican, and an independent. The bill would require the commissions to draw congressional district lines on a five-part criterion: "(1) population equality, (2) compliance with the Voting Rights Act, (3) compliance with additional racial requirements (no retrogression in, or dilution of, minorities' electoral influence, including in coalition with other voters), (4) respect for political subdivisions and communities of interest, and (5) no undue advantage for any party."

Number of Federal Election Commissioners
Under current law, the Federal Election Commission (FEC) has six members, no more than three of whom can be members of the same political party, with at least four votes required for any official FEC action. The complaint is that this has resulted in an impotent and gridlocked FEC, with important reforms left unaddressed, such as the updating of campaign finance law for the digital age and effective regulation of political donations. Some advocates for reform have blamed the Republican FEC members for unwillingness either to investigate any potential violations or to impose tougher restrictions, and for loosening restrictions simply by signaling what standards they are willing to enforce.

The proposed bill would give the FEC five commissioners instead of six, reducing the likelihood of tie votes, and require that no more than two can be members of the same political party. It would set up a "Blue Ribbon Advisory Panel" consisting of an odd number of individuals selected by the president from retired federal judges, former law enforcement officials, or people with experience in election law, except anyone who holds any public office at the time of selection, but the president would not be required to choose from among those recommended by the panel. Some observers claim that there would be no built-in benefit for either party.

Reactions and statements

Support

The bill is supported by President Joe Biden, congressional Democrats, and liberal political commentators. In addition, a number of civil rights organizations support the bill, such as the Leadership Conference on Civil and Human Rights (which includes the AFL–CIO, Common Cause, NAACP, Sierra Club, Center for Constitutional Rights, and others), the League of Women Voters, the Brennan Center for Justice, End Citizens United, Stand Up America, and the League of Conservation Voters. The editorial boards of the New York Times and the Washington Post support the bill, with the former saying it would "make the American political system more accessible and accountable to the American people" and "put an end to at least some of the vile voter suppression practices that Republicans have embraced in recent years." The Economist has similarly voiced support for the bill, writing that "making voting easy and secure ought to be the aim of any party committed to democracy" and arguing that, while the bill "is not perfect", it would "restrict the ability of state parties to game voting laws".

Common arguments in support of the bill are that it would limit gerrymandering by mandating districts be drawn by independent redistricting commissions; that it would make voting easier by expanding mail-in voting, requiring at least 15 consecutive days of early voting, and making Election Day a federal holiday; that it would prevent forms of voter suppression like voter-roll purges; that it would reduce the influence of dark money in politics; that it would re-enfranchise felons who have served their sentences; and that it would reduce the influence of "big money" in politics by setting up a donation-matching fund for small-dollar donations. Many political commentators view the bill as a defense against an onslaught of voting restrictions pushed by state Republicans following false claims by former President Donald Trump that the 2020 election was rigged in favor of Joe Biden; in this view, Republicans are pushing a false narrative about the 2020 election in order to lower citizens' confidence in the integrity of elections, and then using that lack of confidence as pretext to impose new voting restrictions.

At a March 2019 news conference before the House of Representatives passed the bill, Speaker of the House Nancy Pelosi said the bill would "restore the people's faith that government works for the public interest, the people's interests, not the special interests". In a June 2021 open letter, more than 100 university professors and scholars urged suspension of the filibuster to pass the Act, writing, "our entire democracy is now at risk" due to Republican efforts at "radical changes to core electoral procedures in response to unproven and intentionally destructive allegations of a stolen election" (the big lie).

Opposition
The legislation is opposed by Republican officials, conservative think tanks like the Heritage Foundation and conservative political commentators. The Wall Street Journal editorial board opposes the bill, contending that it was "designed to auto-enroll likely Democratic voters, enhance Democratic turnout, with no concern for ballot integrity". The editors of National Review, a conservative magazine, similarly oppose the bill, calling it a "radical assault on American democracy, federalism, and free speech". Common criticisms of the bill include allegations that it would undermine election security by, among other things, mandating no-excuse mail-in voting and automatic voter registration, restricting voter ID laws and voter caging, and prohibiting laws against ballot collection; that it would subvert states' rights to set election laws by mandating independent redistricting commissions, preventing states from disenfranchising felons, and setting minimum time periods states must offer early voting; that its financial disclosure regulations restrict free speech rights; and that small-dollar donation matching is wasteful spending. Some Republicans have also expressed concern that it would make it more challenging for Republicans to be elected. 

In 2019, then-Senate Majority leader Mitch McConnell issued a statement criticizing the bill as a "one-sided power grab" by the Democratic Party and said it would not pass the Republican-controlled Senate. He further criticized it for giving the federal government more power over elections, saying it would "[give] Washington, D.C. politicians even more control over who gets to come here [Congress] in the first place." On March 6, 2019, McConnell told reporters that he would not allow the bill a vote on the Senate floor. The White House issued a statement arguing that the bill would "micromanage" elections that are run largely by states and would establish a "costly and unnecessary program to finance political campaigns". U.S. Representative Dan Crenshaw falsely claimed in 2019 that the bill would "legalize" the type of fraud seen in North Carolina in 2018. In March 2021, after the bill passed the House, the conservative organization American Action Network launched an ad campaign against it. On March 10, 2021, Senator Mike Lee said that H.R. 1 was "as if written in Hell by the Devil himself". On April 6, 2021, South Carolina Governor Henry McMaster invoked states' rights as reason to oppose H.R. 1, saying "H.R. 1 is a threat to the constitutional sovereignty of South Carolina".

During a May 2021 Senate Rules Committee hearing, Senator Ted Cruz falsely asserted that House Democrats had "designed" the Act such that it "directs" people "to break the law and register millions of people to vote who are not eligible to vote because they are not United States citizens" and "automatically registers to vote anyone who interacts with the government", regardless of their immigration status. The bill repeatedly states only U.S. citizens would be permitted to register.

In a June 2021 editorial for the Charleston Gazette-Mail, Democratic Senator Joe Manchin, a crucial vote for the bill to see passage in the 117th Congress, wrote "I believe that partisan voting legislation will destroy the already weakening binds of our democracy, and for that reason, I will vote against the For the People Act."

Other
The American Civil Liberties Union opposed the 2019 version of the bill, praising the "many provisions of H.R.1 that we strongly support and have long championed" but arguing that other provisions would "unconstitutionally infringe the freedoms of speech and association" of citizens and public interest groups. The ACLU specifically opposed the DISCLOSE Act provisions (which, among other things, would require organizations that engage in campaign-related disbursements to disclose the names and addresses of donors who give $10,000 or more) and the expanded Stand By Every Ad Act provisions (which would broaden existing disclosure requirements).

In 2021, the ACLU stopped short of opposing the bill. The group said, "Following the Trump administration's relentless attacks on our democratic system of government, a serious legislative effort to restore and strengthen our republic is needed now more than ever, and we strongly support many of the voting rights provisions in H.R.1" but that proposed requirements for some organizations to disclose certain donors were "onerous and dangerous". Some former ACLU officials signed a joint letter from constitutional scholars that advocated for passage of the bill as "most significant pro-democracy legislation since the Voting Rights Act of 1965" and wrote, "We do not view First Amendment concerns over the precise scope of disclosure requirements affecting large donors to tax-exempt organizations operating on the margins of electoral politics as outweighing the need for expeditious enactment of the clearly desirable aspects of H.R.1 into law."

Constitutionality
Several conservative commentators and lawyers, as well as 20 Republican State Attorneys General, have asserted that H.R.1 is unconstitutional. Among their claims are that each state, not the federal government, has the power to oversee and regulate elections under the Constitution, and that provisions of the bill would violate the First Amendment as well as previous Supreme Court rulings such as McPherson v. Blacker and Bush v. Gore. Some legal scholars, such as Trevor Potter and Franita Tolson, have rejected these claims, noting that the Elections Clause in ArticleI, Section4 of the Constitution gives the Congress the power "at any time" to "make or alter" state election regulations. 

In September 2020, the progressive group Take Back the Court published a report arguing that if H.R. 1 were enacted, the Supreme Court would likely strike down its key elements (independent redistricting provisions, automatic voter registration, public campaign financing, disclosure requirements) "on the basis of implausible constitutional analysis" of the Elections Clause and the First, Tenth, and Fourteenth Amendments. The report said that "though arguments ... that the Court's majority is likely to deploy are unpersuasive, the conservative majority has issued rulings that dismantle democracy and voting rights repeatedly, often relying on questionable rationales."

Public opinion
According to a January 2021 poll conducted by progressive think tank Data for Progress, American voters broadly support the legislation, with nearly 67% supporting the bill, even after participants were provided opposition messaging. According to the poll, 77% of Democratic voters, 68% of independent voters, and 56% of Republican voters support the act. 

A recording of a private conference call obtained by The New Yorker between a policy adviser to Senate Minority Leader Mitch McConnell and the leaders of several prominent conservative groups revealed that the Koch Brothers-affiliated advocacy group Stand Together had invested "substantial resources" researching H.R. 1's popularity and message-testing opposition talking points. The group had concluded not only that the bill is broadly popular with the American public, but that opposition messaging to it is largely ineffective and so turning public opinion against it would be "incredibly difficult." It found that the argument that the bill "stops billionaires from buying elections" is particularly resonant with the public and conservatives should avoid publicly debating it, but instead attempt to stop the bill with legislative maneuvers such as the filibuster.

Unsuccessful efforts to pass

Passage in House in 2019 and 2020 and blockage in Senate
In January 2019, the bill passed the Democratic-majority House of Representatives on a party-line vote, but was killed in the Republican-controlled Senate. In the next Congress, in January 2021, a nearly identical bill again passed the House. Senate Republicans uniformly opposed the bill; they could block it through a filibuster, a procedural hurdle requiring a supermajority of 60 votes to advance legislation. In order to take action on the voting-rights bill and other legislative priorities, Senate Democrats considered filibuster reform, changing Senate rules in order to make the filibuster more difficult to use.

Continued blockage in the Senate
Much attention has been paid to Senator Joe Manchin's position on H.R.1 and, relatedly, the filibuster. As the most conservative Senate Democrat, Manchin would need to support filibuster reform in order for H.R.1 to pass over unified Republican opposition. He vehemently opposes abolishing the filibuster, citing a desire for bipartisanship, but implied he was open to the idea of restoring the filibuster to its "popular imagination" where, in order to sustain a filibuster, senators must actually keep speaking on the Senate floor to extend debate and keep the bill open. Speaking to Axios's Mike Allen, Manchin said that "there should be pain to a filibuster" for those carrying it out, but later clarified that he does not support changing the 60-vote threshold to pass legislation or specific carve-outs for certain legislation like voting rights bills, as some progressive groups advocate. Manchin later clarified his comments on making the filibuster more painful to use, writing in an op-ed that he would not vote to weaken it at all.

Unsuccessful narrower proposal: Freedom to Vote Act
In early June 2021, Manchin came out against the For the People Act, but later that month proposed a list of changes that, if adopted, would allow him to support the legislation. The compromise proposal, the Freedom to Vote Act (S. 2747), was formally introduced by Manchin, Amy Klobuchar, and other Democratic senators on September 14, 2021. It kept many parts of the original bill (including automatic voter registration for eligible citizens, making Election Day a holiday, creating a minimum 15-day early voting period for federal elections, and a prohibition on partisan gerrymandering), but added a mandatory nationwide voter ID requirement and dropped several other provisions in the original bill, such as a requirement for states to offer no-excuse mail-in voting and same-day voter registration. A Brennan Center for Justice research report said that the narrowed bill "contains the vast majority of the most critical provisions that were in the For the People Act, although it does also reflect some important concessions that were needed to achieve unity among Senate Democrats." 

Manchin's proposed compromise was largely backed by Democrats and allies, including prominent figures such as voting rights advocate Stacey Abrams, Senator Bernie Sanders, and former President Barack Obama, but Senate Republicans rejected it. On June 22, 2021, Republicans blocked debate on the bill: a motion to proceed failed on a 50–50 party-line vote, ten votes short of the 60-vote supermajority required to move forward. 

Democrats attempted to pass the Freedom to Vote Act again on January 19, 2022, as part of a combined bill with the John Lewis Voting Rights Act, but again failed to invoke cloture after a 50-50 party-line vote. They then attempted to change Senate rules to exempt both bills from the filibuster, but Senators Manchin and Kyrsten Sinema joined Senate Republicans in voting against the change.

Legislative history

See also

 Government by the People Act, a 2014 bill with some of the same goals and co-sponsors
 Fair Representation Act
 John Lewis Voting Rights Act
 Republican efforts to make voting laws more restrictive following the 2020 presidential election

Notes

References

Proposed legislation of the 116th United States Congress
Proposed legislation of the 117th United States Congress
Gerrymandering in the United States
Voting in the United States
Civil rights in the United States
Voter suppression